Gianluca Susta (born 10 April 1956, Biella) is an Italian politician. He is a member of the Italian Senate, elected in February 2013. Previously he served as Mayor of Biella from 1992 to 2004, he was a member of the European Parliament between 8 May 2006, when he took up a seat vacated after the 2006 Italian general election and his election to the Italian Senate. He represents the Margherita within the ALDE parliamentary group. He took a pro-European stance by signing the Spinelli Group Manifesto.

References

External links
 Gianluca Susta Web site
 

1956 births
Living people
Democratic Party (Italy) MEPs
MEPs for Italy 2009–2014
MEPs for Italy 2004–2009
21st-century Italian politicians
Democracy is Freedom – The Daisy MEPs
Mayors of Biella
University of Turin alumni
Democratic Party (Italy) politicians
Democracy is Freedom – The Daisy politicians
Italian People's Party (1994) politicians
Christian Democracy (Italy) politicians